Lauren Wilkinson (born 3 January 1989) is a British ice hockey player. She played for the 2011 Great Britain women's national ice hockey team.

References

1989 births
British women's ice hockey forwards
Living people